Wesley Victor Lofts (15 November 1942 – 22 May 2014) was an Australian rules footballer who played for Carlton in the Victorian Football League (VFL) during the 1960s.

A key defender, Lofts represented the Victorian interstate team in both 1963 and 1967. He was a premiership player with Carlton in 1968 and missed out on a second premiership in 1970 when he was dropped for the finals series.

Following his retirement, he remained involved with Carlton in an administrative capacity, and in 1998 was inducted into the Carlton Hall of Fame.

Wes Lofts died on 22 May 2014 after a long battle with emphysema, aged 71.

References

External links

Blueseum profile

1942 births
2014 deaths
Australian rules footballers from Victoria (Australia)
Carlton Football Club players
Carlton Football Club Premiership players
One-time VFL/AFL Premiership players